The Almolonga volcano, also called "Cerro Quemado" (Burned Mountain) or "La Muela" (The Molar) due to its distinct shape, is an andesitic stratovolcano in the south-western department of Quetzaltenango in Guatemala. The volcano is located near the town of Almolonga, just south of Quetzaltenango, Guatemala's second largest city.

The volcano is set along the Zunil fault zone and has a central caldera surrounded by several dacitic and rhyolitic lava domes and formed in a back-arc volcanic setting, with activity commencing 84,000BP. Almolonga stratovolcano is the oldest edifice and underwent collapse prior to the caldera forming eruption of Lake Atitlan, the major chronological marker of volcanism in the region. The collapse of the stratovolcano left a caldera with a diameter of 3,3 km and a depth of 350m that was subsequently occupied by lava domes on its northern edge and covered by tephra layers from numerous volcanoes, both in the Almolonga field and others. Cerro Quemado is the largest (about 2 km3) and youngest lava dome complex formed by eight vents with viscous lava flows and plugs during four distinct volcanic phases - the first two involving effusion of lava and formation of new domes. Cerro Quemado underwent a flank collapse 1,150BP, generating a landslide that went 6 km SSW in the Llano de Pinal valley and occupied an area of 13 km2, generating a lateral blast that affected the neighbouring Volcán Siete Orejas volcano as well. A lava dome emerged inside the collapse scar subsequently. 1818 an eruption formed a block lava flow over half a year that travelled 2.5 km eastward. Lahars and further explosive activity are potential hazards from this volcano.

See also
List of volcanoes in Guatemala

References
 
 
 

Stratovolcanoes of Guatemala
Subduction volcanoes
Mountains of Guatemala
Pleistocene stratovolcanoes
Holocene stratovolcanoes